{{Automatic taxobox 
| taxon = Murrayonida
| authority = Vacelet, 1981
| subdivision_ranks = Families
| subdivision = 
 Lelapiellidae
 Murrayonidae
 Paramurrayonidae}}

The Murrayonida' are an order of sea sponges in the subclass Calcinea. 

Taxonomy
The order consists of four known species, in three families: 

Family Murrayonidae Dendy & Row, 1913 
 Murrayona phanolepis Kirkpatrick, 1910 - discovered by C. W. Andrews on Christmas Island and the species name proposed in honor of Sir John Murray, who financed the Christmas Island expedition, and the corresponding name was later given to the order.

Family Lelapiellidae Borojevic, Boury-Esnault & Vacelet, 1990
 Lelapiella incrustans Vacelet, 1977
 Lelapiella sphaerulifera Vacelet, 1977

Family Paramurrayonidae Vacelet, 1967 
 Paramurrayona corticata'' Vacelet, 1967

Description
Murrayonida are distinguished from other Calcinea by having a reinforced skeleton; like another line of Calcinea, the Leucettidae, but unlike most other Calcinea, the Murrayonida sponges also have a cortex covering the cormus and a leuconoid aquiferous system.

References

Calcinea
Taxa named by Jean Vacelet